Justin Rakotoniaina (14 December 1933 – November 2001) was a diplomat who briefly served as Prime Minister of Madagascar in 1976–1977 after Joël Rakotomalala was killed in a helicopter accident. He was a member of the Association for the Rebirth of Madagascar.

References

1933 births
2001 deaths
Association for the Rebirth of Madagascar politicians
Malagasy diplomats
Prime Ministers of Madagascar